Redouan El Yaakoubi (born 25 January 1996) is a Dutch professional footballer who plays as a right-back for Eredivisie club Excelsior.

Club career
El Yaakoubi played in the youth academy of USV Elinkwijk. In 2015, he joined Hoofdklasse club VV De Meern. With De Meern, El Yaakoubi promoted to the Derde Divisie. In May 2017, after having initially decided to move to DVS '33, El Yaakoubi opted to sign for FC Utrecht led by manager Erik ten Hag. He made his Eerste Divisie debut for Jong FC Utrecht on 25 August 2017 in a game against FC Dordrecht.

After six matches for the reserve team in the Eerste Divisie, El Yaakoubi signed his first professional contract with FC Utrecht; a two-and-a-half-year deal with an option for an additional season. In July 2019, however, he signed for two years with SC Telstar.

On 6 April 2021, El Yaakoubi signed a two-year contract with Excelsior with an option for an additional season.

Personal life
Born in the Netherlands, El Yaakoubi is of Moroccan descent.

References

External links
 

1996 births
Living people
Footballers from Utrecht (city)
Dutch footballers
Dutch sportspeople of Moroccan descent
USV Elinkwijk players
Jong FC Utrecht players
SC Telstar players
Excelsior Rotterdam players
Eerste Divisie players
Eredivisie players
Association football defenders
Vierde Divisie players